Khvorzan-e Olya (also Romanized as Khvorzan-e ‘Olyā; also known as Khūrzen-e Qadīm, Khūrzīn, and Khvorzīn) is a village in Sedeh Rural District, in the Central District of Arak County, Markazi Province, Iran. At the 2006 census, its population was 26, in 8 families.

References 

Populated places in Arak County